Sohinder Singh Wanjara Bedi (1924-2001) was a Punjabi folklorist and a British Indian born in Sialkot, a city now part of Pakistan.

Personal life
Wanjara Bedi was born in Sialkot, now in Pakistan. He did his M.A. in Punjabi from the Punjabi University and Ph.D. from the University of Delhi. He worked as a senior lecturer of Dayal Singh College, Delhi. Dr. Bedi has written some eighty books, which includes three collections of poems, five books on literary criticism, and some books on Punjab folklore. He has been a proud recipient of some fifteen prestigious literary awards, including the Sahitya Kala Parishad Award. He has been a member of some literary and cultural associations. Bedi's autobiography Galley Chikar Duri Ghar, the book chosen for the award, not only record the autobiographical details of the author's life but also explores new dimensions of a person's total view of life. For the maturity of thought, sincerity of expression the book is considered to be a great contribution to Punjabi literature.

Books
Addhī miṭṭī, addhā sonā 	 
Bātāṃ muḍḍha kadīma dīāṃ	 
Folk tales of India, 
Folklore of the Punjab.	 
Galiey chikkad doori ghari	
Galīe cikaṛu dūri gharu	 
Gurū Arajana Dewa Jī dī bāṇī wica loka-tatta.	 
Gurū Nānaka te loka-prawāha-Guru Nanak and folklore	 
Ika ghuṭa rasa dā.	 
Loka ākhade hana
Virse di phulkari 
Panjabi lokdhara vishav kosh. Vol. 5, 'Kalh' ton 'ghorewah' tak.

Awards
Bedi won the Sahitya Akademi Award in 1988 for his book Galiey Chikar Duri Ghar.

References 

20th-century Indian novelists
Punjabi-language writers
Recipients of the Sahitya Akademi Award in Punjabi
People from Sialkot
1924 births
2001 deaths